Draves is a surname. Notable people with the surname include:

Patricia Draves, president of Graceland University.
Scott Draves, inventor of Fractal Flames, video artist, and VJ (video performance artist).
Vicki Draves (1924–2010), Olympic diving gold medalist.
W.A. Draves, Latter Day Saint leader and founder of the Church of Christ with the Elijah Message.